Anonymous martyr is a term commonly used to refer to the remains of those Iranians who were killed in the Iran–Iraq War but could not be identified, due to limited technology and poor organization. To this day, these Iranian casualties are still unknown. However, the commander of the Iranian Revolutionary Guard, General Rahim Safavi, estimated that there were around 213,000 deaths.

More traditionally the authorities relied on the uniforms and the kind of gear used by the soldier to determine whether he is Iranian or not, but during the recent years there has been an increased use of DNA testings to make that determination. Usually, a mausoleum is built over the tomb of the people to allow for visits.

Memorials 
In recent years, the government has created sites on universities around the country and buried the remains of newly found anonymous martyrs. For example, in 2011, 19 people's remains were honored in 13 locations in the provinces of Tehran, Semnan, Chahar Mahal and Bakhtiyari, Kerman, Fars, Ilam, Markazi, and Lorestan. Some of the bodies were returned to the place where they were born or the places of their martyrdom.

There are also those that were enshrined in monuments, which are often hosted by universities. Notable examples include the Graves and the Monument of Unknown Martyrs at University of Tehran. This is a simple memorial located at the entrance of the mosque of the university and commemorates the martyrdom of Iranian students killed in the Iran-Iraq war. There is also the Graves of Unknown Martyrs on Imam Hussain Square, which is one of Tehran's main public spaces. The city government held a competition for its design, which was won by a concrete five-sided building concept, representing five anonymous martyrs.

To commemorate the anonymous martyr, Shahid Gomnam Expressway in Tehran is named Anonymous.

References 

Iran–Iraq War